Alan Albert Freeman, known professionally as Alan A. Freeman (27 September 1920 – 15 March 1985) was an English record producer, remembered for being Petula Clark's producer from 1949 until 1963, when his role was taken over by Tony Hatch. Freeman founded the independent Polygon label and worked for its successor labels, Pye Nixa and Pye. He also produced number 1 hits by Lonnie Donegan.

Career 

Freeman was born in St. John's Wood, north west London, in September 1920, to Aileen Freeman (née Marks) and her husband Leslie. By his late teens, Alan was working as a clerk for a music publisher. His ambition had always been to have a record label and make his own records with it. In 1949, he was working for the Ed Kassner music publishing company as a song plugger, when he inherited some money, and began to go ahead with his project. His friend, pianist Joe Henderson, knew the singer and actress Petula Clark, whose father Leslie was keen to launch her as a recording artist. Henderson introduced Alan to Leslie Clark, who invested some money of his own (or Petula's) in the new label.

The label, Polygon Records, was a brave attempt by Freeman to gain a footing in the British record market, at a time when it was dominated by Decca and EMI (HMV, Columbia and Parlophone). The earliest recordings were actually made for the Australian market as Freeman had a contact there, and he wanted to test the water. By 1950, Polygon was active, and during its lifetime, over 180 78rpm records were made over five years, all of them produced by Freeman, including over 50 titles by Clark.

By 1955, the label had been a small success, gathering a few chart hits (the biggest of which was "The Little Shoemaker" by Clark, reaching no. 7), but no runaway success. Freeman was approached by New Zealand businessman Hilton Nixon who had a similar dream to his own. Hilton wanted to establish Nixa Records but had run into problems with distribution. Thus Polygon was swallowed up by Nixa and became Pye Nixa Records.

Freeman continued to produce records, but shared responsibilities with several others. He also produced "Gamblin' Man" / "Puttin' On the Style"	and "My Old Man's A Dustman", which were number 1 hits recorded by the skiffle performer Lonnie Donegan. By 1959, the company had dropped the 'Nixa' part and evolved into simply Pye Records. Clark was still recording for Pye, but with little success. Freeman found a song that was to relaunch her British career. The song was "Sailor", written by David West, a pseudonym for Norman Newell. It made number 1 in February 1961.

Freeman also produced recordings of London performances by Marlene Dietrich, and records featuring British comedian Tony Hancock; the latter's re-enactments of "The Blood Donor" and "The Radio Ham" for an LP was a best seller in 1961. During the 1970s, Freeman was a frequent panellist on ATV's Saturday night talent programme, New Faces.

Personal life and death 
Freeman married Shirley Bennett on 22 October 1968, and the couple had two children. They were divorced on 1 January 1985. Freeman died on 15 March 1985 in Carshalton, in Sutton, Greater London, aged 64. He was survived by his sister Pat.

See also
 Independent record label
 Petula Clark
 Polygon Records

References

External links
 Discogs entry

1920 births
1985 deaths
English record producers
Pop music articles needing attention
British music industry executives
20th-century British businesspeople
People from Marylebone
People from Hendon